Paul Charles Gaudoin (born 12 August 1975 in Perth, Western Australia) is an Australian former field hockey defender and midfielder, who was a member of the team that won the bronze medal at the 2000 Summer Olympics in Sydney. Four years earlier, he won his first bronze medal at the Olympics. He is the former coach of the Australia women's national field hockey team. He quit in March 2021 before a report of a toxic team culture was released.

References

 Profile on Hockey Australia

External links
 

1975 births
Australian male field hockey players
Olympic field hockey players of Australia
Olympic bronze medalists for Australia
Field hockey players at the 1996 Summer Olympics
Field hockey players at the 2000 Summer Olympics
1998 Men's Hockey World Cup players
2002 Men's Hockey World Cup players
Field hockey players from Perth, Western Australia
Living people
Commonwealth Games gold medallists for Australia
Olympic medalists in field hockey
Medalists at the 2000 Summer Olympics
Medalists at the 1996 Summer Olympics
Commonwealth Games medallists in field hockey
Male field hockey defenders
Male field hockey midfielders
Australian people of Anglo-Indian descent
Australian sportspeople of Indian descent
Field hockey players at the 1998 Commonwealth Games
Field hockey players at the 2002 Commonwealth Games
Medallists at the 1998 Commonwealth Games
Medallists at the 2002 Commonwealth Games